Alexandrovsk may refer to:

Russia 
 Alexandrovsk, Murmansk Oblast, a closed administrative-territorial formation
 Polyarny, Murmansk Oblast, called Alexandrovsk until 1931
 Alexandrovsk, Perm Krai
 Alexandrovsk-Sakhalinsky (town), in Sakhalin Oblast
 Belogorsk, Amur Oblast, called Alexandrovsk until 1931

Ukraine 
 Oleksandrivsk, Luhansk Oblast
 Zaporizhzhia, called Alexandrovsk until 1921

United States 
 Nanwalek, Alaska, site of the former Russian fortress of Alexandrovsk

See also
 Alexandrovsky District
 Fort-Shevchenko founded as Fort Alexandrovsk, a military-base town on the Caspian Sea
 Alexandrovsk, the former name of Alexandrovskoye, Stavropol Krai
 Alexandrovsk-Grushevsky, name of the city of Shakhty, Rostov Oblast, Russia, in 1881–1921
 Alexandrovka, Russia
 Alexandrovsky, Russia